Heitor Villa-Lobos's Étude No. 10, part of his Twelve Études for Guitar, was first published by Max Eschig, Paris, in 1953.

History
The autograph manuscript of Etude No. 10 is dated 1929, Paris.

Structure
The piece is in B minor and is marked Très animé – un peu animé – vif.

Analysis

Étude No. 10 is a study in technique that presents great challenges to the player. It is in ternary form (ABA), but the return of the opening material is transformed into dance-like rhythmic cells. An unusual technical feature is the use of the right-hand little finger.

References

Cited sources

Further reading
 Wright, Simon. 1992. Villa-Lobos. Oxford Studies of Composers. Oxford and New York: Oxford University Press.  (cloth);  (pbk).

Compositions by Heitor Villa-Lobos
Guitar études
Compositions in B minor